Campanula primulifolia is a plant species of the genus Campanula. It is native to Portugal and Spain.

primulifolia